(WecA, WecA transferase) is an enzyme with systematic name . This enzyme catalyses the following chemical reaction

   

This enzyme is isolated from Mycobacterium tuberculosis and Mycobacterium smegmatis.

References

External links 
 

EC 2.7.8